The Bush Theatre is located in the Passmore Edwards Public Library, Shepherd's Bush, in the London Borough of Hammersmith and Fulham. It was established in 1972 as a showcase for the work of new writers. The Bush Theatre strives to create a space which nurtures and develops new artists and their work. A seedbed for the best new playwrights, many of whom have gone on to become established names in the industry, the Bush Theatre has produced hundreds of premieres, many of them Bush Theatre commissions, and hosted guest productions by theatre companies and artists from across the world.

Artistic Directors
 Jenny Topper (1977–88), jointly with Nicky Pallot (1979–90)
 Dominic Dromgoole (1990–96)
 Mike Bradwell (1996–2007)
 Josie Rourke (2007–12)
 Madani Younis (2011–2018)
Lynette Linton (2019–present)

History

On Thursday 6 April 1972, the Bush Theatre was established above The Bush public house on the corner of Goldhawk Road and Shepherd's Bush Green, in what was once the dance studio of Lionel Blair. It was established by a maverick actor, Brian McDermott, who used to tour the Fringe. The venue, despite its fame and massive output, was intimate, with a maximum audience of approximately 80. The first production was an adaption of The Collector by John Fowles, directed by John Neville and starring Annette Andre and Brian McDermott.

Throughout 1992, the Bush Theatre celebrated 20 years at the frontier of new writing. "What has held the Bush together for 20 years? Blind faith, youthful commitment and a tenacious belief in new writing: above all, perhaps, the conviction that new work deserves the highest standards in acting, direction and design," The Guardian. The Bush won The Empty Space Award for the year's work, which included Billy Roche's Bush plays A Handful Of Stars, Poor Beast in the Rain and Belfry playing in repertory as The Wexford Trilogy, which toured to Wexford Opera House and the Abbey Theatre, Dublin.

In November 2010, the Bush Theatre announced it would be leaving its home of nearly forty years and moving to the former Passmore Edwards Public Library building, round the corner from its first home, on Uxbridge Road.

The relocation took place in 2011 and the new venue opened with the "Sixty-Six Books" project. This was a celebration of the anniversary of the publication of the King James Bible, which used 66 writers, many of whom were veterans of the Bush.

That same year, Artistic Director Josie Rourke announced her departure from the Bush to take up the position of Artistic Director of the Donmar Warehouse. The Board appointed Madani Younis as her successor from January 2012. In 2013, he programmed the theatre's most successful season to date, which saw the theatre play to 99% capacity.

In Spring 2016, the Bush Theatre relocated its plays to found spaces around Shepherd's Bush and Notting Hill, as the former library building closed for the largest capital project in the theatre's history. Borrowing new and iconic spaces with their own histories and tales of the local community, this season of work welcomed new audiences and residents by offering a number of free and subsidised theatre tickets to local people.

In March 2017, following a landmark year of taking plays into the communities of West London, the Bush Theatre returned home following a £4.3m revitalisation of the venue. The year-long redevelopment was driven by the aim of realising Younis’ vision for a theatre that reflected the diversity and vibrancy of London. Upon reopening, the building was to be more sustainable and entirely accessible, with a new entrance, front-of-house area and exterior garden terrace to the main street. 

Lynette Linton became Artistic Directory in January 2019, following Younis' appointment as Creative Director at the Southbank Centre. That same year, the theatre was named London Theatre of the Year by The Stage. 

In response to the COVID-19 pandemic, the Bush Theatre filmed several of its productions and offered them to online viewers.

Venue
Following the 2016/17 redevelopment, the Bush Theatre has two performance spaces:
 The Theatre, a reserved seating venue with a maximum capacity of 180. It has remained in its original location and can be configured in a thrust, end on or in the round layout.
 The Studio, an unreserved seating venue with a maximum capacity of 70, is a home for emerging artists and producers. Similarly, this space can be configured in a thrust, end on or in the round layout.

The building also contains an Attic rehearsal space and Writer's Room, along with a Café Bar, garden terrace and playtext library, which is the largest public theatre reference library in the United Kingdom.

The redevelopment of the venue was 'Cultural Project of the Year' finalist at the AJ Architecture Awards 2017, and 'Highly commended Cultural Building' at the AJ Retrofit Awards 2017, and selected by the Hammersmith Society as winner of their Conservation Award for 2017.

New writing
The Literary Department at the Bush Theatre is committed to discovering the best new plays from playwrights from the widest range of backgrounds and therefore seek unsolicited submissions throughout the year in dedicated script windows. The Bush is a proud champion of playwrights, with a keen interest in those voices not often heard, and reflecting the contemporary culture of London, the UK and beyond. The Department receives nearly 2000 scripts a year from new and established playwrights, all of which are read and considered for production or development at the Bush.

Awards
1977 – George Devine Award to Robert Holman for German Skerries1979 – George Devine Award to Jonathan Gems for The Tax Exile 1982 – Samuel Beckett Award for Coming Clean by Kevin Elyot1986 – Laurence Olivier Award Nomination for Outstanding Achievement to Robert Holman for Making Noises Quietly1989 – John Whiting Award for Handful of Stars by Billy Roche1993 – Laurence Olivier Award Nomination for Outstanding Achievement to Billy Roche for The Wexford Trilogy1993 – Susan Smith Blackburn Award to Jane Coles for Backstroke In A Crowded Pool1993 – John Whiting Award for The Clearing by Helen Edmundson1994 – John Whiting Award for Beautiful Thing by Jonathan Harvey1995 – Laurence Olivier Award Nomination for Beautiful Thing by Jonathan Harvey1996 – Susan Smith Blackburn Award to Naomi Wallace for One Flea Spare1997 – Meyer-Whitworth Award to Conor McPherson for This Lime Tree Bower1998 – George Devine Award to Helen Blakeman for Caravan1998 – Meyer-Whitworth Award to Daragh Carville for Language Roulette1999 – George Devine Award to Mark O'Rowe for Howie the Rookie2005 – Meyer-Whitworth Award to Stephen Thompson for Damages2006 – Susan Smith Blackburn Award to Amelia Bullmore for Mammals2007 – Susan Smith Blackburn Award to Abbie Spallen for Pumpgirl2013 – Pulitzer Prize for Disgraced by Ayad Akhtar

Books
To celebrate 40 years of the Bush Theatre, "Close-Up Magic": 40 Years at the Bush Theatre was published, charting the history of the theatre and including contributions from past directors, actors, writers and audience members.

Productions
A list of selected productions of the Bush Theatre.
 2019 The Arrival by Bijan Sheibani
 2019 Strange Fruit by Caryl Phillips
 2018 Misty by Arinzé Kene
 2018 Leave Taking by Winsome Pinnock
 2018 Dismantle Festival by Project 2036
2017 The Hijabi Monologues by Amal Abdi, Hanan Issa, Sahar Ullah and Nimmo Ismail
2016 The Royale by Marco Ramirez
 2016 Boys Will Be Boys by Melissa Bubnic
 2016 Right Now by Catherine-Anne Toupin
 2016 Pink Mist by Owen Sheers
 2015 Forget Me Not by Tom Holloway
 2015 RADAR 2015
 2015 F*ck the Polar Bears by Tanya Ronder
 2015 The Invisible by Rebecca Lenkiewicz
 2015 The Angry Brigade by James Graham
 2015 The Royale by Marco Ramirez
 2015 Islands by Caroline Horton
 2014 Visitors by Barney Norris
 2014 Albion by Chris Thompson
 2014 RADAR 2014
 2014 Perseverance Drive by Robin Soans
 2014 Incognito by Nick Payne
 2014 We Are Proud to Present a Presentation by the Herero of Namibia, formerly known as South West Africa, from the German Sud-Ouest Afrika Between the Years 1895 – 1915 by Jackie Sibblies-Drury
 2014 Ciphers by Dawn King
 2013 Jumpers for Goalposts by Tom Wells
 2013 RADAR 2013
 2013 The Herd by Rory Kinnear
 2013 Josephine and I by Cush Jumbo
 2013 Disgraced by Ayad Akhtar (Winner of the Pulitzer Prize for Drama)
 2013 Three Birds by Janice Okoh
 2013 Money the game show by Clare Duffy
 2012 Straight by D. C. Moore
 2012 Snookered by Ishy Din
 2012 Chalet Lines by Lee Mattinson
 2012 The Beloved by Amir Nizar Zuabi
 2012 Mad About the Boy by Gbolahan Obisesan
 2012 Fear by Dominic Savage
 2012 Our New Girl by Nancy Harris
 2011 The Kitchen Sink by Tom Wells
 2011 Sixty-Six Books by Sixty-Six Writers
 2011 This is where we got to when you came in by non zero one
 2011 Where's My Seat? by Dierdre Kinahan, Tom Wells and Jack Thorne
 2011 In The Beginning by Nick Payne
 2011 Moment by Deirdre Kinahan
 2011 Little Platoons by Steve Waters
 2011 The Knowledge by John Donnelly
 2010 My Romantic History by D C Jackson
 2010 The Aliens by Annie Baker
 2010 The Great British Country Fete by Russell Kane and Michael Bruce
 2010 Like A Fishbone by Anthony Weigh
 2010 A Little Gem by Elaine Murphy
 2010 Eigengrau by Penelope Skinner
 2010 The Whisky Taster by James Graham
 2009 The Contingency Plan by Steve Waters
 2009 The Stefan Golaszewski Plays by Stefan Golaszewski
 2009 If There Is I Haven't Found It Yet by Nick Payne
 2009 Sea Wall by Simon Stephens
 2009 2 May 1997 by Jack Thorne
 2009 suddenlossofdignity.com by Zawe Ashton, James Graham, Joel Horwood, Morgan Lloyd Malcolm & Michelle Terry
 2009 Apologia by Alexi Kaye Campbell
 2009 Stovepipe by Adam Brace
 2009 Wrecks by Neil LaBute
 2008 50 Ways to Leave your Lover at Christmas by Leah Chillery, Ben Ellis, Stacey Gregg, Lucy Kirkwood, Morgan Lloyd Malcolm & Ben Schiffer
 2008 I Caught Crabs in Walberswick by Joel Horwood
 2008 Broken Space Season by Neil LaBute, Bryony Lavery, Simon Stephens, Declan Feenan, Mike Bartlett, Nancy Harris, Lucy Kirkwood, Ben Schiffer, Jack Thorne & Anthony Weigh
 2008 Turf by Simon Vinnicombe
 2008 50 Ways to Leave Your Lover by Leah Chillery, Ben Ellis, Stacey Gregg, Lucy Kirkwood & Ben Schiffer
 2008 2,000 Feet Away by Anthony Weigh
 2008, Tinderbox by Lucy Kirkwood
 2008 Artefacts by Mike Bartlett
 2008 Helter Skelter/Land of the Dead by Neil LaBute
 2007 ! by Mike Packer
 2007 How To Curse by Ian McHugh
 2007 Flight Path by David Watson
 2007 Trance by Shoji Kokami
 2007 Elling by Simon Bent
 2007 Tom Fool by Franz Xaver Kroetz
 2007 I Like Mine With a Kiss by Georgia Fitch
 2007 Product: World Remix by Mark Ravenhill
 2007 What Would Judas Do by Stewart Lee
 2006 Whipping It Up by Stephen Thompson
 2006 Bones by Kay Adshead
 2006 Pumpgirl by Abbie Spallen
 2006 Cruising by Alecky Blythe
 2006 Crooked by Catherine Trieschmann
 2006 Trad by Mark Doherty
 2006 Christmas Is Miles Away by Chloe Moss
 2006 Try These On For International Size by Reg Cribb, Jón Atli Jónasson, Abbie Spallen, Shoji Kokami
 2006 Monsieur Ibrahim and the Flowers Of The Qur'an by Eric-Emmanuel Schmitt
 2005 When You Cure Me by Jack Thorne
 2005 Bottle Universe by Simon Burt
 2005 After the End by Dennis Kelly
 2005 The Obituary Show by The People Show
 2005 Kingfisher Blue by Lin Coghlan
 2005 Mammals by Amelia Bullmore
 2005 Take Me Away by Gerald Murphy
 2005 Bites by Kay Adshead
 2004 Going Donkeys by Richard Cameron
 2004 How Love Is Spelt by Chloe Moss
 2004 Damages by Steve Thompson
 2004 Adrenalin...Heart by Georgia Fitch
 2004 One Minute by Simon Stephens
 2004 Christmas by Simon Stephens
 2003 The God Botherers by Richard Bean
 2003 Airsick by Emma Frost
 2003 Nine Parts of Desire by Heather Raffo
 2003 Little Baby Nothing by Catherine Johnson
 1999 Howie the Rookie by Mark O'Rowe
 1998 "Martin and John" by Sean O'Neill adapted form Dale Peck's novel
 1998 "Love Upon the Throne" by Patrick Barlow
 1997 Disco Pigs by Enda Walsh
 1997 Love and Understanding by Joe Penhall
 1997 St Nicholas by Conor McPherson
 1997 All of You Mine by Richard Cameron
 1991 The Pitchfork Disney by Philip Ridley
 1988 A Handful of Stars by Billy Roche
 1987 Dreams of San Francisco by Jacqueline Holborough
 1987 It's A Girl by John Burrow
 1987 Tattoo Theatre by Mladen Materic
 1987 The Mystery of the Rose Bouquet by Mauel Puig
 1987 Effies Burning by Valerie Windsor
 1987 People Show No 92 Whistle Stop by People Show
 1987 Love Field by Stephen Davis
 1987 More Light by Snoo Wilson
 1987 An Imitation of Life by Abbie Spallen
 1986 The Oven Glove Murders by Nick Darke
 1986 Making Noise Quietly by Robert Holman
 1985 Kiss of the Spider Woman by Manuel Puig
 1983 Hard Feelings by Doug Lucie
 1980 Duet for One by Tom Kempinski
 1972 The Relief of Martha King by David Parker
 1972 Christmas Carol by Frank Marcus
 1972 Plays for Rubber Gogo by Christopher Wilkinson

Bibliography

References

External links

Pub theatres in London
Theatres in the London Borough of Hammersmith and Fulham
Producing house theatres in London
Shepherd's Bush